Jessie Kite (17 May 1892 – 1 May 1958) was a British gymnast. She won a bronze medal in the women's team event at the 1928 Summer Olympics.

References

1892 births
1958 deaths
British female artistic gymnasts
Olympic gymnasts of Great Britain
Gymnasts at the 1928 Summer Olympics
Olympic bronze medallists for Great Britain
Olympic medalists in gymnastics
Medalists at the 1928 Summer Olympics
People from Hackney Central
Sportspeople from London